Rainald Maria Goetz (born 24 May 1954, in Munich) is a German author, playwright and essayist.

Biography
After studying History and Medicine in Munich and earning a degree (PhD and M.D) in each, he soon concentrated on his writing.

His first published works, especially his novel Irre ("Insane"), published in 1983, made him a cult author of the intellectual left. To the delight of his fans and the dismay of some critics, he mixed neo-expressionist writing with social realism in the vein of Alfred Döblin and the fast pace of British pop writers such as Julie Burchill. During a televised literary event in 1983, Goetz slit his own forehead with a razor blade and let the blood run down his face until he finished reading.

Goetz has the reputation of an enthusiastic observer of media and pop culture. He has embraced avant-garde   philosophers such as Foucault and Luhmann as well as the DJs of the techno movement, especially Sven Väth.

He kept a  blog in 1998–99 called Abfall für alle ("rubbish for everybody"), which was later published as a book.

Goetz has won numerous literary awards.

Awards and honors
1983 Kranichsteiner Literaturpreis
1988 Mülheimer Dramatikerpreis
1991 Heinrich-Böll-Preis
1993 Mülheimer Dramatikerpreis
1999 Else Lasker-Schüler Dramatist Prize
2000 Wilhelm Raabe Literature Prize
2000 Mülheimer Dramatikerpreis
2012 Berliner Literaturpreis
2013 Schiller-Gedächtnispreis
2013 Marieluise-Fleißer-Preis
2015 Georg Büchner Prize
2018 Order of Merit of the Federal Republic of Germany

Selected works
 Irre (1983), the novel which made him famous. English translation titled Insane.
 Krieg ("War") (1986). Three plays.
 Kontrolliert ("Controlled") (1988).
 Festung (1993). Plays.
 1989 (1993), a collage of media from the years of the German Reunification, 1989–90.
 Rave (1998).
 Jeff Koons (1998).
 Abfall für alle ("Rubbish for everyone") (1999).
 Klage ("Complaint") (2008).
 Johann Holtrop (2012).

References

External links
Rainald Goetz: New German dramatic art (website of the Goethe-Institut)
"To Live and to Write: The Existence Mission of Writing." Hyperion: On the Future of Aesthetics, Vol VII, No 1, 2013.

1954 births
Living people
German male writers
Officers Crosses of the Order of Merit of the Federal Republic of Germany
Georg Büchner Prize winners